The Grande Parei (2,705 m, sometimes written Grande Parel) is a mountain in the Beaufortain massif in Savoie, France. The Beaufortain is situated about 20 km South-West of Mont Blanc.

References

Mountains of the Alps
Mountains of Savoie